The Travel Air Manufacturing Company was an aircraft manufacturer established in Wichita, Kansas, United States in January 1925 by Clyde Cessna, Walter Beech, and Lloyd Stearman.

An early leader in single-engine, light-aircraft manufacturing, from 1925 to 1931, Travel Air was the largest-volume aircraft manufacturer in the United States in 1928 -- the principal contributor to Wichita becoming named the "Air Capital City" by the Aeronautical Chamber of Commerce.

Travel Air produced the trend-setting Travel Air Mystery Ship racer, which forced radical changes in U.S. military aircraft. Travel Air also developed early small airliners, including Delta Airlines' first, and the first civilian plane to reach Hawaii by air.

With Walter Beech as its last President, the company was acquired by Curtiss-Wright Corporation, and moved to St. Louis, Missouri, before production ceased in the Great Depression. However, Beech returned to Wichita in 1932, acquired the abandoned Travel Air factory, and resumed production under his own name, with the Beech Aircraft Corporation — producing what would have been the 17th Travel Air model, but as the Beech Model 17 "Staggerwing."

History

Early biplanes

The company initially built a series of sporting and training open-cockpit biplanes, including the Model A, Model B, Model BH, and Model BW (These were subsequently renumbered.) Other types included the 5000 and 6000 high wing cabin monoplanes and the CW / 7000 mailplane.

The A differed in some minor details such as lacking the overhanging Fokker style ailerons that gave the rest of the series the nickname Wichita Fokker (not present on all of the later models though), while the B, BH and BW differed only in the engine installed – the A and B had a Curtiss OX-5, the BH had a Hispano-Suiza V-8, the BW had a Wright radial (of various types)  though other radials would be installed later (especially after it became the 4000). 

Aside from the Wichita Fokkers seen in such movies as Howard Hughes' Hell's Angels, likely the most famous of the open cockpit biplanes was N434N, a D4D (the ultimate derivative of the BW) painted in Pepsi colors for airshow and skywriting use which survives in the National Air & Space Museum's Udvar-Hazy annex.  A second, backup D4D, N434P, used by Pepsi in later years to supplement and fill-in for the original aircraft, is housed in the Hiller Aviation Museum in San Carlos, California.

Cabin monoplanes
 The Travel Air 5000 was a Cessna design, ordered in small numbers for National Air Transport. Two were custom-built long-range endurance aircraft similar in concept to Charles Lindbergh's Spirit of St. Louis. Woolaroc, flown by Art Gobel won the disastrous Dole Air Race from Oakland, California to Hawaii in which the majority of contestants disappeared at sea or otherwise died attempting the crossing.

Travel Air then produced the Model 6000, a five or six-seat high-wing cabin monoplane — intended for airline use, and for very wealthy private owners.

 A small fleet of Travel Air 6000s were the first airliners for Delta Air Service (eventually renamed Delta Airlines). In 1928, National Air Transport operated the Type 6000 on their mail and passenger routes from Chicago to Dallas, Kansas City and New York. 

Two Travel Air 6000 were purchased by the Paraguayan government during the Chaco War (1932–1935) for the Transport Squadron of its Air Arm. These planes belonged to TAT with the registrations NC624K (c/n 6B-2011) and NC9815 (c/n 6B-1029); They received the military serials T-2 and T-5 (later reserialled as T-9). The planes were intensively used during the conflict as air ambulances. They both survived the war and continued flying in the air arm. In 1945, they were transferred to the first Paraguayan airline, Líneas Aéreas de Transporte Nacional (LATN) and received the civil registrations ZP-SEC and ZP-SED. They were withdrawn from use in 1947.

Cabin biplanes
The CH or 7000 — a single=engine, cabin biplane, with a pilot's open-cockpit above-and-behind the small, enclosed cabin for cargo or passengers — found little success, but ended up in Alaska as an early bushplane.

Racing monoplanes
Travel Air was also responsible for a series of very successful racing aircraft, which due to the company being extremely secretive about them during development, were named Mystery Ships by the press. In 1929, at the National Air Races in Cleveland, the first Travel Air Model R Mystery Ship became the first American airplane to outrun the nation's top fighter aircraft, winning the Thompson Trophy unlimited-class pylon race.  The Mystery Ships dominated the racing circuit for several years and had the distinction of being faster than anything the U.S. military had on strength. It forced the U.S. military to face the need to give up biplane fighters and water-cooled engines.

Its renown led to one example being sold to the Italians which inspired the design of a racing aircraft and the Breda Ba.27 fighter.

Acquisition by Curtiss-Wright
Travel Air merged with the Curtiss-Wright Corporation in August 1929. Curtiss-Wright continued to manufacture some of the Travel Air designs though they were renumbered again so that the 4000 became the 4, the 6000 became the 6. Additional types that had been close to production number from 8 to 16 were built while under Curtiss-Wright management such as the Curtiss-Wright CW-12. which in various marks was sold to several South American countries.

Travel Air Founder (with Clyde Cessna and Lloyd Stearman) Walter Beech resigned from the Curtis-Wright Corporation in March 1932 to form Beech Aircraft Company in Wichita,Ks.

Powder Puff Derby

In August 1929, the first Women's Air Derby was held. Of the 20 entrants in the Women's Air Derby, otherwise known as "the Powder Puff Derby", seven flew Travel Airs and it was Louise Thaden who won the Santa Monica, Calif., to Cleveland race. Opal Kunz finished eighth. The other five Travel Airs were flown by Pancho Barnes, Claire Fahy, Marvel Crosson, Mary von Mack, and Blanche Noyes.

One of the odd qualifications was that the aircraft would have to have horsepower “appropriate for a woman.” Opal Kunz was told her airplane was too fast for a woman to handle, and had to get another aircraft or stay out of the race. “…Though Opal Kunz owned and flew her own 300 horse power Travel Air, it was disallowed since it was deemed by the judges to be “too fast for a woman to fly.” With 25,000.00 in prize money at stake, she bought a lower powered Travel Air to race with.”

Aircraft

References

Notes

Bibliography

 
 Hagedorn, Dan; Antonio Luis Sapienza: Aircraft of the Chaco War, 1928-1935. Schiffer Publishing Co. Atglen, PA. 1996
 Sapienza Fracchia, Antonio Luis: La Contribución Italiana en la Aviación Paraguaya. Author's edition. Asunción, 2007. 300pp.

External links

 http://aerofiles.com/_travel.html accessdate 2011-08-22
 Travel Air – The Last Days, by Edward H. Phillips, March 5, 2021, King Air Magazine

Defunct aircraft manufacturers of the United States